Men Do What They Can is a 2012 German movie directed by Marc Rothemund.

With 746,017 admissions it was the sixth most successful film in Germany in 2012.

Cast
Wotan Wilke Möhring: Paul Schuberth
Jasmin Gerat: Iris Jasper
Jan Josef Liefers: Guido Schamski
Fahri Ögün Yardim: Bronko Steiner
Oliver Korittke: Günther
Karoline Schuch: Iggy
Friederike Kempter: Kathrin
Anne Weinknecht: Andrea
Tobias Oertel: Timothy Huntington
Hedi Kriegeskotte: Frau Hoffmann
Peter Sattmann: Dr. Görges
Noémi Besedes: Katja Riebinger
Miranda Leonhardt: Biggi
Manuel Cortez: Rodriguez
Emilia Schüle: Sophie

References

External links
 

2012 films
German comedy films
2010s German-language films
Films directed by Marc Rothemund
2010s German films